A Comarca da Sertã is a local newspaper published weekly in Sertã, Portugal.

It was first published on 9 May 1936, edited by Eduardo Barata da Silva Corrêa. Later it was developed by Amaro Vicente Martins. Since 2005 it is edited by João Miguel Barata Martins.

The newspaper is owned by Verde Press - Edições, Lda.

References

1936 establishments in Portugal
Portuguese-language newspapers
Newspapers established in 1936
Weekly newspapers published in Portugal